The SuperCan is a platform game developed by Greve Graphics for the Commodore 64 and published in 1986 by American Action. The music in The SuperCan was the first on the C64 to include single-channel delay.

References

External links
 The Super Can at gamebase 64

1986 video games
Commodore 64 games
Commodore 64-only games
Platform games
Video games developed in Sweden